The 2022 Quaker State 400 was a NASCAR Cup Series race held on July 10, 2022, at Atlanta Motor Speedway in Hampton, Georgia. Contested over 260 laps on the 1.54-mile-long (2.48 km) asphalt quad-oval intermediate speedway, it was the 19th race of the 2022 NASCAR Cup Series season.

Report

Background

Atlanta Motor Speedway is a track in Hampton, Georgia, 20 miles (32 km) south of Atlanta. It is a  quad-oval track with a seating capacity of 111,000. It opened in 1960 as a  standard oval. In 1994, 46 condominiums were built over the northeastern side of the track. In 1997, to standardize the track with Speedway Motorsports' other two  ovals, the entire track was almost completely rebuilt. The frontstretch and backstretch were swapped, and the configuration of the track was changed from oval to quad-oval. The project made the track one of the fastest on the NASCAR circuit.

Entry list
 (R) denotes rookie driver.
 (i) denotes driver who is ineligible for series driver points.

Rule Change
On June 14, Bob Pockrass reported NASCAR will use the superspeedway format for Atlanta, with no practice session. Teams will qualify after inspection.

Qualifying
Qualifying for Saturday was cancelled due to rain and Chase Elliott, the point leader, was awarded the pole as a result.

Starting lineup

Race

Stage Results

Stage One
Laps: 60

Stage Two
Laps: 100

Final Stage Results

Stage Three
Laps: 100

Race statistics 
 Lead changes: 27 among 12 different drivers
 Cautions/Laps: 13 for 64
 Red flags: 0
 Time of race: 3 hours, 22 minutes and 18 seconds
 Average speed:

Media

Television
USA covered the race on the television side. Rick Allen, Jeff Burton, Steve Letarte, and 2004 Atlanta winner Dale Earnhardt Jr. called the race from the broadcast booth. Dave Burns, Kim Coon and Marty Snider handled the pit road duties from pit lane. Rutledge Wood served as a “CityView” reporter and share stories from the famed Dawsonville Pool Room and Georgia Racing Hall of Fame.

Radio
The race was broadcast on radio by the Performance Racing Network and simulcast on Sirius XM NASCAR Radio. Doug Rice and Mark Garrow called the race from the booth when the field raced down the front stretch. Doug Turnbull called the race from atop a billboard outside of turn 2 when the field raced through turns 1 and 2 & Pat Patterson called the race from a billboard outside of turn 3 when the field raced through turns 3 and 4. On pit road, PRN was manned by Brad Gillie, Brett McMillan and Wendy Venturini.

Standings after the race

Drivers' Championship standings

Manufacturers' Championship standings

Note: Only the first 16 positions are included for the driver standings.
. – Driver has clinched a position in the NASCAR Cup Series playoffs.

References

2022 in sports in Georgia (U.S. state)
2022 NASCAR Cup Series
Quaker State 400
NASCAR races at Atlanta Motor Speedway